The 2020 Hyundai Monterey Sports Car Championship was a sports car race sanctioned by the International Motor Sports Association (IMSA). The race was held at WeatherTech Raceway Laguna Seca in Monterey County, California on November 1st, 2020. This race was the tenth round of the 2020 WeatherTech SportsCar Championship, and the seventh round of the WeatherTech Sprint Cup.

The overall race was won by Hélio Castroneves and Ricky Taylor, their fourth victory of the season. In LMP2, PR1 Mathiasen Motorsports secured the class victory by default, as no other teams were entered. The GTLM class was won for the second consecutive race by Porsche, albeit this time with the #912 team of Earl Bamber and Laurens Vanthoor. In GTD, Mario Farnbacher and Matt McMurry scored their second victory of the season.

Background
Initially scheduled to be run on September 13th, the event was rescheduled for the weekend of November 1st, as a result of the COVID-19 pandemic. The event was run behind closed doors in order to maintain compliance with California state gathering regulations, as it was the only DPi round, and second GT round (Virginia International Raceway the other round in the season) to be held as such, as the second Daytona, Road America, Mid-Ohio, Charlotte, and both Sebring and Road Atlanta rounds were run with spectators.  In May, Hyundai was announced as the new title sponsor of the event.

No changes were made to IMSA's balance of performance from the previous round at Road Atlanta.

Entries

A total of 28 cars took part in the event, split across four classes. 8 were entered in DPi, 1 in LMP2, 6 in GTLM, and 13 in GTD. DPi's only changes were between the two JDC entries. With João Barbosa's exit from the team, Tristan Vautier was drafted in to replace him. As a result, Stephen Simpson returned to the #85 to partner Matheus Leist. LMP2 was reduced to just one entry due to a back injury sustained by Era Motorsport driver Dwight Merriman, leaving championship leaders PR1 Mathiasen Motorsports as the only entrant. In GTD, Alessandro Balzan replaced Toni Vilander as Scuderia Corsa's pro driver. Sprint competitors Team Hardpoint and Compass Racing also returned after skipping Petit Le Mans.

Qualifying
Juan Pablo Montoya took overall pole for the event. Patrick Kelly secured the LMP2 pole by default, while Jordan Taylor started first in GTLM. In GTD, Matt McMurry scored pole position for Meyer Shank Racing.

Qualifying results

Results

References

External links

Hyundai Monterey Sports Car Championship
Hyundai Monterey Sports Car Championship
Hyundai Monterey Sports Car Championship